Lauren Morecroft (born 4 May 1987) is an Australian rules footballer who played for the Western Bulldogs in the AFL Women's competition. Morecroft was drafted by the Western Bulldogs with their 13th selection and 101st overall in the 2016 AFL Women's draft. She played two matches in her debut season. She was delisted at the conclusion of the 2017 season.

References

External links 

1987 births
Living people
Western Bulldogs (AFLW) players
Australian rules footballers from Victoria (Australia)
Victorian Women's Football League players